Liberty Monument may refer to:

Liberty Monument (Ticonderoga), monument to the history of Fort Ticonderoga, erected 1924
Liberty Monument (Nicosia), monument to Cyprus independence fighters, erected 1973
Liberty Monument (Seychelles), monument to independence, erected 2014
Liberty Statue (Budapest), erected 1947
Battle of Liberty Place Monument, New Orleans monument to the Battle of Liberty Place, erected 1891 and dismantled 2017

See also
Monument of Liberty (disambiguation)
Freedom Monument (disambiguation)
Statue of Liberty in New York